The Land Before Time X: The Great Longneck Migration is a 2003 direct-to-video animated adventure musical drama film and the tenth film in the Land Before Time series.

Plot 
Littlefoot has an ominous "sleep story" (dream) where he sees the "Great Circle" (the sun) falling out of the sky, and when he mentions it to his grandparents, they reveal they are sharing the same experience, with his grandpa lamenting that they need to go somewhere. Littlefoot explains his situation to his friends and they become interested. Led only by their instinct, they leave the next day. Out of curiosity, Cera, Spike, Ducky, and Petrie follow them. During their trek, Littlefoot is nearly eaten by a Sarcosuchus while playing in a swamp, but a Supersaurus named Sue saves his life by stepping on the predator and joins him and his grandparents, as she is driven on by the same sense as them. They are soon joined by dozens of other Longnecks feeling the same instincts. Meanwhile, Littlefoot's friends are attacked by the Sarcosuchus in the same swamp that Littlefoot and his grandparents passed through, but they manage to escape. That night, they sleep next to what appears to be a large boulder. The next morning, they discover that the "boulder" was a sleeping gray Tarbosaurus, which wakes up and chases them. They escape into a small cave and meet Pat, an elderly Apatosaurus.

Littlefoot, his grandparents, and Sue reach a large crater where hundreds of Longnecks have gathered. There, he meets his long-lost father, Bron, for the first time. Bron tells Littelfoot how he was separated from Littlefoot's mother during the great "earthshake" (earthquake) in the first film. During his wanderings in search of Littlefoot, Bron became the leader of a herd of longnecks and the guardian to a young, mischievous Brachiosaurus, Shorty, who becomes jealous of Littlefoot taking all of his father's attention. Meanwhile, Pat tells Littlefoot's friends that the Longnecks are being driven by a tradition involving a solar eclipse, which was taken as a sign that the sun will be sent crashing down into the Earth by the "Night Circle" (the moon). Every solar eclipse, Longnecks from all around the world gather in one location to stretch their necks up and "catch" the sun, so they can propel it back up into the sky. Soon after, Pat steps into a pool of lava, which burns his leg badly, but he is still able to move as they escape the lava field.

On the day of the eclipse, Littlefoot wakes up to see Shorty traveling over the crater walls and running away, out of spite for being ignored by Bron. He catches up to Shorty and convinces him to stay; they reconcile and agree to see themselves as brothers. Moments later, Littlefoot's friends appear, with a brown Tarbosaurus pursuing them. Pat defends the children but is slowed down by his burned leg. Bron rushes to their aid and is able to temporarily knock out the Sharptooth, then a third green Tarbosaurus and the gray Tarbosaurus arrive. Littlefoot's grandparents join in the fight and defeat the green Sharptooth. Bron fights the brown Sharptooth again while Pat fights the grey one. As soon as all three Sharpteeth are defeated, the eclipse begins, and the sudden darkness forces the Sharpteeth to retreat towards the end.

Littlefoot, his grandparents, Bron, Shorty, Sue, and Pat take their place among the other Longnecks, who have all gathered on top of the crater walls. They succeed in "catching" the sun, and everyone rejoices as the eclipse ends. With their mission completed, the different Longneck herds depart on their separate ways. Sue departs with an Ultrasaurus. Littlefoot's friends ask Pat to come live with them in the Great Valley, which he accepts. Littlefoot is initially hesitant in leaving Bron, as he is the leader of a migratory herd, but he eventually realizes that he belongs in the Great Valley. Accepting this, Bron leaves with Shorty and his herd, promising to keep in touch with Littlefoot and visit him. Littlefoot returns to the Valley with his friends, grandparents, and Pat.

Voice cast 

 Alec Medlock as Littlefoot
 Kiefer Sutherland as Bron
 Kenneth Mars as Grandpa Longneck
 Miriam Flynn as Grandma Longneck
 Aria Curzon as Ducky
 Jeff Bennett as Petrie
 Rob Paulsen as Spike
 Anndi McAfee as Cera
 Brandon Michael DePaul as Shorty
 James Garner as Pat
 Bernadette Peters as Sue
 John Ingle as Narrator/Topsy

Production 
The film is known internationally as "The Great Migration", rather than "The Great Longneck Migration". It was the first film in the series to use fully computer-generated dinosaurs.

Aspect ratio 
Even though this film was presented in full screen on DVD worldwide (since that is what aspect ratio the film was created in), the film is matted to anamorphic widescreen (cropping the top and bottom of the image) on a Hebrew DVD in Israel.

Marketing 
The film was the subject of a massive marketing push for Universal. Prior to the release of Journey to Big Water, Universal orchestrated a yearlong 15th anniversary promotion between the release of the 9th and 10th entries including DVD re-releases of previous franchise entries, “Land Before Time” events at Universal theme parks, introducing merchandise like a “Land Before Time” ear thermometer and creating a club named after lead character Littlefoot with newsletters and activities.

Music 
The music was scored by Michael Tavera with additional music composed by Stephen Coleman. This was the first film in the series that did not use James Horner's original score.

Release 
 December 2, 2003 (VHS and DVD)
 September 19, 2006 (DVD - 2 Tales of Discovery and Friendship)
 August 5, 2008 (Carrying Case DVD with Fun Activity Book - 2 Tales of Discovery and Friendship - Universal Watch on the Go)

Reception 
The Great Longneck Migration received nominations for "Best Animated DVD Premiere Movie" and "Best Original Song" at the 2003 DVD Exclusive Awards, losing to 101 Dalmatians II: Patch's London Adventure and Run Ronnie Run!, respectively.

See also 
 List of films featuring eclipses

References

External links 
 
 

2003 direct-to-video films
Direct-to-video sequel films
The Land Before Time films
2003 animated films
2003 films
Films directed by Charles Grosvenor
Films scored by Michael Tavera
Universal Animation Studios animated films
Universal Pictures direct-to-video animated films
2000s American animated films
Films about volcanoes
Animated films about dinosaurs
2000s children's animated films
Animated films about friendship
2000s English-language films